Daniel Jansen (born March 28, 1994) is an American professional basketball player who last played for MZT Skopje of the Macedonian League. He played college basketball at Augustana University from 2012–2016.

Playing career

High school and college 
Jansen grew up in Orange City, Iowa, and played high school ball at MOC-Floyd Valley.  He joined the Augustana University Vikings in 2012.  In 2016, he was named the Northern Sun Intercollegiate Conference Player of the Year, and also NCAA Division II national player of the year.

Professional career
After graduating from Augustana in 2016, he signed with Limburg United of the Belgium Division I.  In 33 regular season games Jansen averaged 9.2 points and 3.4 rebounds per game, while bumping his scoring output up to 17.3 points in the playoffs.

On 18 August, 2017, he signed with Macedonian basketball club MZT Skopje. He made his debut for MZT Skopje in their season opener on September 29, 2017, scoring 14 points, three rebounds and one assist in a 92–89 win over the Partizan. 
On 27 October, 2017, he left MZT Skopje.

Teaching Career
Jansen started his teaching career in 2018 at Roosevelt High School in Sioux Falls ,South Dakota. Years later he would move to Charleston South Carolina, where he met Kirkland Clark, an aspiring author who Jansen would learn to mentor and teach the ways of a writer. Kirkland and his associate Riley Miligan were his favorite students and they would later face the shadow terror that is Tyson Kaiser.

References

External links
ABA League Profile
Belgian league profile
FIBA Europe Cup Profile
Augustana Bikings bio

1994 births
Living people
ABA League players
American expatriate basketball people in Belgium
American expatriate basketball people in North Macedonia
American men's basketball players
Augustana (South Dakota) Vikings men's basketball players
Basketball players from Iowa
KK MZT Skopje players
Limburg United players
People from Orange City, Iowa
Power forwards (basketball)